Richard Gavin Bryars (born 16 January 1943) is an English composer and double bassist. He has worked in jazz, free improvisation, minimalism, historicism, avant-garde, and experimental music.

Early life and career
Born on 16 January 1943 in Goole, in the East Riding of Yorkshire, England, Bryars studied philosophy at Sheffield University but became a jazz bassist during his three years as a philosophy student.

The first musical work for which he is remembered was his role as bassist in the trio Joseph Holbrooke, alongside guitarist Derek Bailey and drummer Tony Oxley. The trio began by playing relatively traditional jazz – they toured with saxophonist Lee Konitz in 1966 – before moving into free improvisation. Bryars became dissatisfied with this when he saw a young bassist (later revealed to be Johnny Dyani) play in a manner that seemed to him to be artificial, and he abandoned improvisation, becoming interested in composition instead. In 1998 the trio reformed briefly, giving two live performances and making recordings.

Bryars's first compositions owe much to the New York School of John Cage (with whom he briefly studied), Morton Feldman, Earle Brown and minimalism. One of his earliest pieces, The Sinking of the Titanic (1969), is an indeterminist work that allows the performers to take a number of sound sources related to the sinking of the RMS Titanic and make them into a piece of music. The first recording of this piece appeared on Brian Eno's Obscure Records in 1975. The 1994 recording was remixed by Aphex Twin as Raising the Titanic (later collected on the 26 Mixes for Cash album). In 2012, the centenary of the Titanic's sinking, Bryars made a new extended version, with film projections by Bill Morrison and Laurie Olinder, that included his four children as a low-string ensemble (viola, 2 cellos, bass) and turntablist Philip Jeck, subsequently released on GB records (BCGBCD21 2013)

Another well-known early work is Jesus' Blood Never Failed Me Yet (1971), which has as its basis a recorded loop of a vagrant singing a musical fragment that the old man had improvised. On top of that loop, rich harmonies played by a live ensemble are built, always increasing in density, before the whole thing gradually fades out. A recording of this work was made in 1993 with Tom Waits singing along with the original recording of the vagrant during the final section.

Bryars was a founding member in May 1970 of the Portsmouth Sinfonia, an orchestra whose membership consisted of performers who "embrace the full range of musical competence" – and who played popular classical works. Its members included Brian Eno, whose Obscure Records label would subsequently release works by Bryars. In one of the label's first three releases, Eno's album Discreet Music, Bryars conducted and co-arranged Three Variations on the Canon in D Major by Johann Pachelbel, which constitutes the second half of the album.

Bryars's later works have included A Man in a Room, Gambling (1992), which was written on commission from Artangel. Bryars's music is heard beneath monologues spoken by the Spanish artist Juan Muñoz, who talks about methods of cheating at card games. The ten short works were played on BBC Radio 3 without any introductory announcements, and Bryars has said that he hoped they would appear to the listener in a similar way to the shipping forecast, both mysterious and accepted without question. His cello concerto Farewell to Philosophy was recorded in 1996 by Julian Lloyd Webber.

Bryars has written many other works, including five operas, and many instrumental pieces, among them four string quartets and several concertos. He has written several pieces for dance, including Biped (1999) for Merce Cunningham, as well as works for William Forsythe, Carolyn Carlson, Edouard Lock and David Dawson. In 1981–1984 Bryars participated in the CIVIL warS, a vast, never-completed multimedia project by Robert Wilson, who also directed his first opera, Medea. He has also written a large body of vocal and choral music for groups such as the Hilliard Ensemble, the Latvian Radio Choir, the Estonian National Men's Choir, Red Byrd, Trio Mediaeval, Singer Pur, and The Crossing, whose recording of "The Fifth Century" won a Grammy in 2019. He has written a great deal for early music performers including six books of madrigals, several works for viol consort and a collection of 54 "laude" based on a 12th century manuscript.

Bryars' When Harry Met Addie (a tribute to jazz singer Adelaide Hall and saxophonist Harry Carney) was premiered at the Duke Ellington Memorial Concert at the Queen Elizabeth Hall, London, on 1 May 1999. The piece was performed by the London Sinfonietta Big Band and commissioned by the baritone saxophonist/bass clarinettist John Surman. Cristina Zavalloni sang the soprano and the London Sinfonietta Big Band was conducted by Diego Masson·

Bryars founded the music department at Leicester Polytechnic (now De Montfort University), and was Professor of Music there for several years. He left in 1994 to concentrate on composition and performance. He lives in England, and, for part of the year, on the west coast of Canada.

Since 1986 Bryars has run The Gavin Bryars Ensemble with his preferred musicians, consisting chiefly of low strings. Now, in addition, this regularly includes his children (2 cellos, piano and double bass)

Since 1974 Bryars has been a member of the Collège de 'Pataphysique and was elected Regent in 2001. In 2015 he was named Transcendent Satrap, the highest honour in the Collège, a position he shares with Marcel Duchamp, Man Ray, Eugène Ionesco, Umberto Eco, and others.

In 2020, Bryars composed Altissima Luce for Sound World’s Coronavirus Fund for Freelance Musicians, a project supporting struggling musicians during the UK’s Covid 19 lockdown. It was included on the album Reflections alongside specially written pieces by other composers such as Nico Muhly, Mark-Anthony Turnage, Evelyn Glennie and Sally Beamish.

Personal life
Bryars is married to Anna Tchernakova, a Russian filmmaker, and has a stepdaughter and son. Bryars has two daughters from his first marriage.

Selected works
 The Sinking of the Titanic (1969, first performance: Queen Elizabeth Hall, London, 1972)
 Necropolis, soundtrack for Franco Brocani film (1970)
 Jesus' Blood Never Failed Me Yet (for pre-recorded tape and ensemble), 1972
 Medea (opera, libretto after Euripides), 1982, revised 1984 and 1995
 CIVIL WarS (incomplete opera collaboration with Robert Wilson), 1984. Some sections of the music exist in completed form, as follows:
 On Photography for Chorus (SATB), harmonium, piano
 2B for Percussion ensemble
 Arias For Marie Curie, The Queen of the Sea, Captain Nemo, The Japanese Bride
 String Quartet No. 1 Between the National and the Bristol, 1985
 Cadman Requiem (dedicated to Bill Cadman, his sound recordist, who perished in Pan Am 103), 1989
 String Quartet No. 2, 1990
 A Man in a Room, Gambling, for speaking voice and string quartet (text: Juan Muñoz), 1992
 The War in Heaven, cantata for soprano, counter tenor, chorus and orchestra
 The North Shore for viola and piano, 1993
 Three Elegies for Nine Clarinets, 1994
 Cello Concerto Farewell to Philosophy, 1995
 Adnan Songbook, 1996
 Doctor Ox's Experiment, opera, 1998
 String Quartet no.3, 1998
 Biped – music for the dance by Merce Cunningham, 1999
 When Harry Met Addie - music for soprano voice (vocalise) and big band, 1999
 G (Being the Confession and Last Testament of Johannes Gensfleisch, also known as Gutenberg, Master Printer, formerly of Strasbourg and Mainz), opera, 2002.I Have Heard It Said That a Spirit Enters, 2002
 Nothing like the Sun – 8 Shakespeare sonnets for soprano, tenor, speaking voice, eight instruments, 2007
 Piano Concerto ("The Solway Canal"), 2010
 Marilyn Forever - opera, 2013
 Hövdingar hittast (Heroes Meet), 2014 with Rúni Brattaberg (bass) and Eivør Pálsdóttir (soprano) - A collection of pieces based on Faroese and Icelandic sagas
 Pneuma - ballet, 2014, with Carolyn Carlson
 The Seasons - ballet, 2014, with Edouard Lock
 11th Floor - ballet with Edouard Lock
 The Fifth Century - cantata for choir and saxophone quartet, text from Thomas Traherne, 2014
 The Heart of August - ballet with Eduard Lock
 The Collected Works of Billy the Kid, chamber opera, text by Michael Ondaatje, 2018
 Requiem - ballet with David Dawson Dutch National Ballet, for full orchestra, choir and four soloists 2019
 A Native Hill - large a cappella choral work for The Crossing, setting Wendell Berry 2019
 Altissima Luce - trio for bass-clarinet, viola and cello
 String Quartet no.4, 2020
 Wittgenstein Fragments for soprano, flute and string quartet 2021
 In Là collaboration for installation with sculptor Massimo Bartolini, Prato, Italy 2022
 Strng Sextet ("The Bridges of Könisberg") 2022
 Three New Gnossiennes (after Satie) in memoriam Ornella Volta 2022

References

Annexes
 Bibliography 
 Jean-Louis Tallon, Gavin Bryars, en paroles, en musique, le Mot et le reste, 2020

 Filmography 
 Jacqueline Caux, Dolce voce, 2012
 ECM50 | 1990 Gavin Bryars'', 2019 (Episode in a 50-part series on ECM Records)

External links
 
 short film portrait on Gavin Bryars and his work with ECM Records, shot at his house in Leicestershire (2019)
 BBC interview (2004)
 Culture Kiosque Interview (2000)
 Morton Feldman interviewed by Gavin Bryars and Fred Orton (1976)
 Interview by Ethan Iverson
 Cello Concerto Reviews
 :lt:Gavinas Bryarsas

1943 births
20th-century classical composers
20th-century English composers
21st-century classical composers
Academics of De Montfort University
Alumni of the University of Sheffield
Contemporary classical music performers
ECM Records artists
English classical composers
English double-bassists
Male double-bassists
EMI Classics and Virgin Classics artists
English experimental musicians
English male classical composers
English opera composers
Experimental composers
Historicist composers
Living people
Male opera composers
Minimalist composers
Musicians from Yorkshire
People from Goole
Postminimalist composers
21st-century double-bassists
20th-century British male musicians
21st-century British male musicians
Joseph Holbrooke (band) members